Communist Party of Armenia may refer to:

Party prior to Soviet era 
Armenian Communist Party, established in 1917 in Caucasus as a liberation movement of Western Armenia

Party in Soviet era
Communist Party of Armenia (Soviet Union), established in 1920 and ruling Soviet Armenia from 1920 to 1990, and dissolved forming Armenian Democratic Party instead

Parties in the Republic of Armenia era
Armenian Communist Party, established 1991 (leader Rouben Tovmasyan)
United Communist Party of Armenia, established 2003 (leader Yuri Manukyan) formed from union and merger of:
Armenian Workers Communist Party
Marxist Party of Armenia, active independently from 1997 to 2003
Renewed Communist Party of Armenia, active independently 2002-2003 before merging
Union of Communists of Armenia
Progressive United Communist Party of Armenia (leader Vazgen Safaryan)

See also
Democratic Party of Armenia, democratic socialist party established in 1991 by Aram Gaspar Sargsyan, the last secretary of the Soviet-era Communust Party of Armenia and made up of former Armenian communists with Sargsyan dissolving the party and declaring the change of name with the establishment of the independent Republic of Armenia